The Carnegie Prize is an international art prize awarded by the Carnegie Museum of Art in Pittsburgh, Pennsylvania. It currently consists of a $10,000 cash prize accompanied by a gold medal.

History
The Carnegie Prize was established in 1896, to recognize the best painting shown in the first annual exhibition of the Museum of Art, Carnegie Institute. Unlike most American annual exhibitions, which were limited to artists born or resident in the United States, the Carnegie exhibitions were international. To attract top painters from home and abroad, the Carnegie exhibitions offered high cash prizes—$1,500 for the First Class winner, $1,000 for the Second-Class winner and $500 for the Third-Class winner. The First-Class winner's cash prize was accompanied by the Carnegie Gold Medal of Honor (1896), designed by Tiffany & Co. and cast by J.E. Caldwell & Co. Often, especially in the early years, the prize-winning painting was purchased for the museum's permanent collection.

The exhibition has undergone a series of name changes and transformations—adding a gold medal for sculpture (beginning in 1958), and going from a schedule of every year to every second or third year, and now, to every fourth or fifth year. The exhibitions in the late 1970s were retrospectives of established artists. In 1982, the exhibition was renamed the Carnegie International, and returned to its original mission of showing recent works by a host of artists. In 1985, the Carnegie Prize was refocused to recognize not just a single work of art but an honoree's entire body of work. In the 1990s, the exhibition expanded to include non-traditional artists and filmmakers.

As of 2019, 67 Carnegie Prizes had been awarded and one was refused (Irish painter Francis Bacon, 1967). The Spanish sculptor Eduardo Chillida was awarded it twice (1964 for an individual sculpture, 1979 for his body of work). American painter Cecilia Beaux was the first woman awarded the Carnegie Prize (1899); German sculptor Rebecca Horn was the second woman (1988). South African artist William Kentridge was the first filmmaker awarded it (1999). Documenta, the German contemporary art exhibition, was the only organization awarded the prize (1979). English artist Lynette Yiadom-Boakye was the first woman of color awarded the prize (2018).

The Carnegie International's prize should not be confused with the Carnegie Prize of the National Academy of Design, the Carnegie Prize of the Society of American Artists, the Carnegie Art Award (Sweden), or with the Carnegie Medal (literary award).

List of Gold Medal winners

See also
 Lists of art awards
 Prizes named after people
 Andrew Carnegie

References

Awards established in 1896
Andrew Carnegie
American visual arts awards
Lists of artists
Carnegie Museum of Art
1896 establishments in the United States